Sudath Prajiv Pasqual (born 15 October 1961) is a former Sri Lankan international cricketer who played two One Day Internationals during the 1979 World Cup competition.

He remains the youngest Sri Lankan ODI cricketer aged 17 years 237 days. An outstanding schoolboy cricketer he led Royal College Colombo at the Royal–Thomian in 1980,

His international career effectively finished when he emigrated to the United States in 1981 and attended Berea College then acquired his masters in political science. Having returned to cricket administration in Sri Lanka (1997–2008) he has now settled in Canada.

References

External links

1961 births
Living people
Sri Lankan cricketers
Sri Lanka One Day International cricketers
Alumni of Royal College, Colombo
Cricketers from Colombo